William Mackrides (July 8, 1925 – January 22, 2019) was an American football quarterback for the Philadelphia Eagles of the National Football League.   He helped the Eagles win the 1948 and 1949 NFL Championships.

Early life 
Mackrides played college football for the University of Nevada, Reno and led the nation in passing in 1946.  In his last professional season in 1953, Mackrides played for the Pittsburgh Steelers and was the last Steeler to wear uniform number 13 in a regular season game until punter Jeremy Kapinos wore that number in 2010.

Mackrides later gained degrees (MS and PhD) in education, undergraduate at West Chester State College, a master's degree at the University of Pennsylvania, and a doctorate in psychology at the University of New Mexico.   He has since retired and  resides in Delaware County, Pennsylvania. He also founded Indian Springs Day Camp, a summer day camp in Chester Springs, Pennsylvania, in 1959, which family owned and operated as of 2013.

See also
 List of NCAA major college football yearly passing leaders

References

1925 births
2019 deaths
Players of American football from Philadelphia
West Chester University alumni
University of Pennsylvania alumni
American people of Greek descent
American football quarterbacks
Nevada Wolf Pack football players
New York Giants players
Hamilton Tiger-Cats players
Philadelphia Eagles players
Pittsburgh Steelers players
United States Marines
United States Marine Corps personnel of World War II
Canadian football quarterbacks
Players of Canadian football from Philadelphia